Bournemouth 7s Festival is a sport and music festival, and takes place over three days across the Spring Bank Holiday Weekend on the South Coast of England.

The festival has been celebrated as the "Sporting Glastonbury"  due its unique combination of sport and live music.

Since being founded in 2008 by Dodge Woodall and Fleur Woodall, Bournemouth 7s Festival has grown to see over 30,000 people attending each year.

The sports 
Each year over 400 teams come together for their sports tour and compete across a large variety of elite and social sports tournaments. The festival currently has five sports: rugby, netball, dodgeball, hockey, and CrossFit.

The festival launched with two sports in 2008, rugby 7s and netball 7s. In 2013, the sporting offering was expanded with the introduction of dodgeball.

This trend continued as hockey was included in 2014. Volleyball and ultimate Frisbee featured from 2018  and were sports at Bournemouth 7s for three years.

CrossFit, hosted by the National Fitness Games, is now the festival's fifth sport, having been introduced in 2021.

The 65-acre festival site accommodates each of the sports, with a total of eight rugby pitches, 12 netball courts, two hockey pitches, two dodgeball arenas, and one CrossFit arena.

The festival 
Since 2008, the festival has expanded the entertainment, arenas and music offering year-on-year.

The festival now offers 12 themed arenas, all of which offer a different genre of music, including house, hip hop, bassline, cheese, and drum and bass, to name a few.

Past headliners include Ella Eyre, Professor Green, Example, MistaJam, and Fatman Scoop. They have been joined by other artists such as Majestic, Artful Dodger, James Haskell, Fred V, René LaVice, FooR, Jaguar Skills, and many more.

As well as sports tournaments and music there is a variety of stalls, fairground rides, and bars.

In the day, the VIP Colourseum arena combines games such as sumo wrestling and beer pong, and in the evening it offers entertainment and live DJs.

The V.VIP arena offers a private area where ticket holders can enjoy pitch-side views of the competitive rugby, a private bar and more DJs and live entertainment. Various celebrities from Harry Redknapp to Lewis Moody have been seen enjoying themselves here.

The history

2008 
Bournemouth 7s first took place in May 2008 with 8,000 people attending and 96 rugby teams competing. It quickly became known for being an end of season rugby tour.

2009 - 2012 
The festival was extended from 2 days to 3 days. Attendance grew to 20,000 and 300 teams competed. After the success of the taster netball sessions in 2008, netball tournaments became a permanent fixture. In 2011, Nintendo became the first headline sponsor.

2013 - 2016 
Dodgeball was introduced as the festivals third sport in 2013, followed closely by the addition of hockey in 2014 which brought the total number of teams competing to 360. The number of festival goers reached 25,000 and 2016 saw Bournemouth 7s’ first headline performance by Fatman Scoop.

2017 - 2019 
The festival reached its capacity of 30,000 people on its 10th anniversary.

2018 was the year of big change for Bournemouth 7s as volleyball and ultimate frisbee were introduced, two new arenas were established and Example headlined on the Saturday.

A further two arenas, Funky Forest and Ya Mum's House, were added in 2019 to take the total to 12. The Saturday was headlined by Professor Green.

2020 - 2021 
Bournemouth 7s Festival 2020 would’ve been held from 29 to 31 May, however was cancelled due to the ongoing COVID-19 pandemic.

The 2021 festival was scheduled to take place on the usual May Bank Holiday weekend, but had to be moved to the August Bank Holiday weekend due to COVID-19 restrictions.

Taking place from 27 to 29 August, the 14th edition saw CrossFit make its debut  as well as Bingo Lingo. Records were broken for the number of attendees and the number of teams competing, of which there were over 400. Ella Eyre headlined on the Saturday.

The venue 
Bournemouth 7s Festival takes place at Bournemouth University Sports Campus in Christchurch, just east of Bournemouth. It is situated on a 65-acre site, which houses the main festival arena, the sports pitches, the campsite and Glamping. The festival hire the land from Bournemouth University, both of whom rely on a strong partnership to work around the challenges a multi-use venue poses.

The founders 
Bournemouth 7s Festival was created by Dodge and Fleur Woodall, who still privately own the event today. Dodge Woodall was introduced to the events industry while at Loughborough University, where he created two student nightclub brands and held 1,500 events over a 10-year period.

In 2007 there were fewer festivals taking place in the UK, and having identified a market for a multi-sports and music event, Woodall saw the opportunity to use his skill set to launch a festival. His aim was to create an ‘unrivalled experience with like-minded sports people and party goers’. Flyers were the main form of promotion until four months prior to the first festival, when Facebook hit the UK and meant a much wider audience could be reached organically.

The launch of Bournemouth 7s Festival saw 96 sports teams compete and 8,000 general admission tickets were bought on the day, at the gates. Woodall is still the CEO of the festival and his wife, Fleur Woodall, is the Financial Director.

Awards 
Bournemouth 7s Festival has received the following awards:

 Event Production Awards 2022 - Sporting Event of the Year 
 Event Production Awards 2019 - Sporting Event of the Year 
 NOEA Awards 2018 - Sporting Event of the Year 
 NOEA Awards 2018 - Large Festival of the Year 
 Bournemouth Tourism Awards 2017 - The Great Time Out 
 NOEA Awards 2017 - Sporting Event of the Year

References 

Sports festivals in the United Kingdom